Mono Plus is an online streaming and former satellite television channel in Thailand owned by Mono Next, a media and technology giant in Thailand.

History 

Mono Plus provides a wide range of content in its Movie Plus, Music Plus and Series Plus strands which are transmitted seven days per week via cable, terrestrial, satellite and IPTV networks.

The sister TV channel of Mono Group, Mono Plus transmits a wide range of alternative content composed of both Thai and foreign movies and series, variety shows and live sports such as basketball, sepak takraw (kick volleyball) and online game competitions.

References

External links

Television stations in Thailand